Cedric Alexander Johnson (born August 16, 1989) is an American professional wrestler currently signed to WWE, where he performs on the Raw brand.

Alexander worked for Ring of Honor (ROH) from 2010 until 2016. He started as part of C&C Factory, a tag team with Caprice Coleman. They worked together until 2014, then he worked as a singles wrestler, usually managed by Veda Scott. He left ROH in 2016, when he was invited to the WWE tournament Cruiserweight Classic. During the tournament, he was eliminated in the second round by Kota Ibushi, but received high praise, with the fans in attendance chanting "Please Sign Cedric". After that, Alexander would sign a contract with WWE, working in their new cruiserweight division as part of the 205 Live brand. At WrestleMania 34, Alexander won a tournament to win the WWE Cruiserweight Championship, retaining the title for 181 days. In April 2019, he was promoted to the Raw brand.

Professional wrestling career

Ring of Honor

C&C Wrestle Factory (2010–2013)
Over the course of 2010, Alexander mostly wrestled dark matches for Ring of Honor (ROH). In 2011 he started performing for ROH on a regular basis after he formed the tag team called the C&C Wrestle Factory with Caprice Coleman.

On December 23 at Final Battle 2011, C&C Wrestle Factory competed in a Tag team gauntlet match for a future ROH World Tag Team Championship title shot where they eliminated the Bravado Brothers (Harlem and Lancelot). On March 30 at Showdown in the Sun Chapter 1, they were defeated by Wrestling's Greatest Tag Team (Charlie Haas and Shelton Benjamin). The next day at Showdown in the Sun Chapter 2, Alexander was defeated by Tommaso Ciampa. On September 15 at Death Before Dishonor X: State of Emergency, they were defeated by S.C.U.M. (Jimmy Jacobs and Steve Corino). At Glory By Honor XI: The Unbreakable Hope on October 13, they once again defeated the Bravado Brothers. On December 16 at Final Battle 2012: Doomsday, they unsuccessfully challenged S.C.U.M. for the ROH World Tag Team Championship in a three-way match that also included the Briscoe Brothers who won the match. On March 3 at the 11th Anniversary Show, he and Coleman were defeated by S.C.U.M. On April 5 at Supercard of Honor VII, C&C Wrestle Factory teamed with B. J. Whitmer, Mark Briscoe and Mike Mondo in a losing effort against S.C.U.M. (Cliff Compton, Jimmy Jacobs, Jimmy Rave, Rhett Titus and Rhino). On May 4 at Border Wars 2013, they defeated A. C. H. and TaDarius Thomas. On May 18 at Relentless, they teamed with Jay Lethal to defeat Matt Taven and reDRagon (Bobby Fish and Kyle O'Reilly). On July 8 at Live And Let Die, Alexander was defeated by Davey Richards. On June 22 at Best in the World 2013, they unsuccessfully challenged reDRagon for the ROH World Tag Team Championship in a three-way match that also included S.C.U.M. (Rhett Titus and Cliff Compton). On August 3 at All Star Extravaganza V, they were defeated by Adrenaline Rush (ACH and TaDarius Thomas) in a three-way match that also included The Young Bucks.

Singles competition (2014–2016)
On January 25 at Wrestling's Finest, he defeated Andrew Everett. On February 8 at State Of The Art, he was defeated by Jimmy Jacobs. On February 21 at the 12th Anniversary Show he teamed with Mark Briscoe and Adam Page in a losing effort against The Decade (Roderick Strong, B. J. Whitmer and Jimmy Jacobs). On March 7 at Raising The Bar – Day 1, he teamed with Adam Page in a tag team match against The Decade where they lost. The next day at Raising The Bar – Day 2 he was defeated by Kevin Steen. On March 22 at Flyin' High he was defeated by Michael Elgin. On April 4 at Supercard of Honor VIII, he lost a match against Roderick Strong. On April 19 at Second To None, he teamed with Andrew Everett in a losing effort against reDRagon. At Global Wars on May 10, he defeated Roderick Strong. After the match he was attacked by Roderick Strong and the rest of The Decade and was put through chairs and his shoulder was separated. Alexander made an appearance at War of the Worlds attacking The Decade from behind. This led to a submission match against Roderick Strong at Best in the World, in which he came out victorious. On August 9, during the Summer Heat Tour, he unsuccessfully challenged Michael Elgin for the ROH World Championship. On September 6 at All Star Extravaganza VI he was scheduled to face Silas Young, but when Young broke his leg and ACH did not show up for the event he challenged Jay Lethal for the ROH World Television Championship where he was defeated. On October 11 at Champions vs. All Stars, he was defeated by Christopher Daniels.  On November 7 at Survival Of The Fittest- Day 1, he was defeated by Adam Page in a 2014 Survival of the Fittest qualifying match. The next day at Survival Of The Fittest- Day 2, he was defeated by Jay Lethal. On November 22 at Tag Wars, he was defeated by Tommaso Ciampa in No Disqualification Grudge Match. On December 7 at Final Battle 2014, he teamed with The Addiction (Christopher Daniels and Frankie Kazarian), but ultimately lost to  The Young Bucks and ACH following a Meltzer Driver and an ACH 450 splash.

On May 16, 2015, at Global Wars '15, Alexander ended Moose's undefeated streak after hitting him with a wrench, turning heel. On June 19 at Best in the World 2015, Alexander reunited with Caprice Coleman, but ultimately broke off the partnership for good, when Coleman refused to allow Alexander to use the wrench again in a match against War Machine (Hanson and Raymond Rowe). Later that same event, he attacked Moose and aligned himself with Moose's former manager Veda Scott, confirming his heel turn.

On May 14, 2016, Alexander announced his departure from ROH.

WWE

205 Live debut (2016–2017) 
On June 13, 2016, Alexander was announced as a participant in WWE's Cruiserweight Classic tournament. The tournament began on June 23 with Alexander defeating Clement Petiot in his first round match. On July 14, Alexander was eliminated from the tournament by Kota Ibushi. The match received high praise, with the fans in attendance chanting "please sign Cedric" and earned a -star rating from Dave Meltzer of the Wrestling Observer Newsletter.

On the August 29 episode of Raw, Alexander was announced as part of the upcoming cruiserweight division. Alexander made his debut on the September 19 episode of Raw as a face, submitting to The Brian Kendrick in a fatal four-way match that included Gran Metalik and Rich Swann to determine the number one contender for the WWE Cruiserweight Championship. On the September 26 episode of Raw, Alexander would get his first win, teaming with Rich Swann to defeat Lince Dorado and Drew Gulak. On the December 6 episode of 205 Live, Alexander started an on-screen relationship with Alicia Fox. Later that night, he was defeated by Noam Dar, and after the match, Dar dedicated his victory to Fox, igniting a feud between the two. On the December 19 episode of Raw, Alexander defeated Dar, but Dar attempted to seduce Fox again afterwards. On the January 10, 2017 episode of 205 Live, Alexander decided to break-up with Fox, after she cost him a match. In March, it was announced that Alexander would be out of action for 3–5 months with a knee injury. He returned from injury on the May 23 episode of 205 Live, defeating Johnny Boone. On the July 11 episode of 205 Live, Alexander defeated Dar in an "I quit" match to end their feud.

Cruiserweight Champion (2017–2018) 

On the December 11 episode of Raw, Alexander won a fatal four-way match to face Drew Gulak the following week, with the winner earning a match against Enzo Amore for the Cruiserweight Championship. Alexander defeated Gulak the following week on Raw to become the number one contender to the championship. On the January 8, 2018 episode of Raw, he faced Amore for the title, which Amore lost by countout, therefore retaining. Alexander was scheduled to face Amore for the Cruiserweight Championship at the Royal Rumble pay-per-view, but the match was cancelled and the title was vacated when Amore was released from WWE.

In the following weeks, a tournament to determine a new champion was arranged, in which Alexander defeated Gran Metalik in the first round, TJP in the quarterfinals, and Roderick Strong in the semi-finals to advance to the final. At WrestleMania 34 on April 8, Alexander defeated Mustafa Ali to win the Cruiserweight Championship. On the following episode of 205 Live, Alexander was attacked by Buddy Murphy during his championship celebration. At the Greatest Royal Rumble event, Alexander made his first successful title defense against Kalisto. Alexander then retained his title against Murphy on the May 29 episode of 205 Live and against Hideo Itami on the July 10 episode of 205 Live. At SummerSlam, Alexander successfully retained his title against Drew Gulak. On the September 19 episode of 205 Live, Alexander defeated Gulak in a SummerSlam rematch to retain the Cruiserweight Championship. At Super Show-Down on October 6, Alexander lost the Cruiserweight Championship against Buddy Murphy, ending his reign at 181 days, and also marking his first televised loss in 2018.

On the November 28 episode of 205 Live, Alexander teamed with Mustafa Ali to defeat Murphy and Tony Nese after Alexander pinned Murphy, this would earn him a title shot against Murphy. At TLC: Tables, Ladders & Chairs, Alexander received his title rematch but failed to regain the title.

Championship pursuits (2019–2020) 
In early 2019, Alexander competed in a tournament for a match for the title at WrestleMania 35, where Alexander lasted until the finals of the tournament, where he lost to Tony Nese. On the March 26 episode of 205 Live, he lost the match to Ariya Daivari when Oney Lorcan cost his match. On the April 17 episode of 205 Live, Alexander lost his final match on the brand against Lorcan, and after the match, the two shook hands as a sign of respect, thus ending their brief feud.

As part of the 2019 WWE Superstar Shake-up, Alexander was drafted to the Raw brand. On the April 22 episode of Raw, Alexander would lose his debut match against Cesaro. On the June 24 episode of Raw, Alexander briefly won the 24/7 Championship from R-Truth before immediately losing it against EC3 during a flurry of title changes. On the July 8 episode of Raw, Alexander, disguised as Gary Garbutt (originally played by the former AAF's Memphis Express president Kosha Irby), teamed with Roman Reigns in a losing effort against Drew McIntyre and Shane McMahon. A week later on Raw, Alexander scored an upset victory over McIntyre, achieving his first victory on the brand.

In August, Alexander entered the King of the Ring tournament, where he defeated Sami Zayn in the first round but lost to Baron Corbin in the quarter finals after he was attacked by The O.C. (AJ Styles, Luke Gallows, and Karl Anderson) prior to the match. The following week on Raw, he would pin Styles in a 10-man tag team match, earning himself a United States Championship title shot. At Clash of Champions, he was defeated by Styles. On the September 30 episode of Raw, Alexander would once again challenge Styles for the United States Championship, but was defeated again.

The Hurt Business (2020–2022) 

On the April 6, 2020 episode of Raw, Alexander formed a tag team with Ricochet as they defeated Oney Lorcan and Danny Burch. In the following weeks, Alexander and Ricochet began feuding with The Hurt Business (MVP, Bobby Lashley, and Shelton Benjamin) after they injured Apollo Crews. On the July 6 episode of Raw, after Alexander and Ricochet lost to MVP and Lashley, MVP approached Alexander and attempted to convince him to join his group with Lashley rather than just be Ricochet's "side kick".
On the August 13 episode of Raw, Alexander pinned Benjamin to win the 24/7 title for a second time only to lose it back to Benjamin later on in the night.

On the September 7 episode of Raw, Alexander attacked his tag team partners Ricochet and Apollo Crews during a six-man tag team match against The Hurt Business, thus joining The Hurt Business and turning heel for the first time in his career. Alexander began teaming with Benjamin as they feuded with The New Day (Kofi Kingston and Xavier Woods) for the WWE Raw Tag Team Championship. At TLC, Alexander and Benjamin defeated New Day to win the WWE Raw Tag Team Championship, only to lose them back to The New Day on the March 15, 2021 episode of Raw.

On the March 29 episode of Raw, Lashley lambasted Alexander and Benjamin due to them losing the Raw Tag Team Championships and losing to Drew McIntyre in a 2-on-1 handicap match, a loss that meant they'd be barred from ringside at Lashley's WWE Championship match at WrestleMania 37 against McIntyre. This led to Lashley attacking Alexander and Benjamin, thus kicking them out of the faction in the process. On the April 5 episode of Raw, Alexander lost to Lashley in singles competition. In the following weeks, Alexander and Benjamin began a losing streak against teams such as The Viking Raiders (Erik and Ivar) twice, and to Riddle and Randy Orton once. On the May 3 episode of Raw, after losing to Lucha House Party (Gran Metalik and Lince Dorado), Alexander insulted Benjamin and said that the team is done.

On the September 27 episode of Raw, Alexander and Benjamin helped Lashley fight off The New Day and in the process, reuniting The Hurt Business. On the November 22 episode of Raw, Alexander defeated Reggie to win the 24/7 title for a third time, only to lose it to Dana Brooke moments later.
Months later in January 2022, after not being seen together, Benjamin and Alexander approached Lashley under the assumption they were still a unit, only to be dismissed. This would cause the pair to launch a sneak attack that evening, but they were easily dealt with.

After his tag team partner Shelton Benjamin got injured, Alexander would be involved in segments where he tried to get in on MVP and Omos' good side during their feud with Bobby Lashley, up until Hell in a Cell when Alexander distracted MVP and Omos during their 2-on-1 Handicap Match which allowed Lashley to pick up the victory. Later on, Lashley would confront Alexander backstage, questioning his motive behind the involvement, with Alexander saying that the distraction was for himself, and that he's "getting sick of being treated like an unwanted twerp", and is going to start standing on his own two feet, to which Lashley was proud of and both ended up shaking hands, therefore turning Alexander face for the first time in two years. On August 8, 2022, Alexander defeated Benjamin in the Main Event tapings, effectively signaling the end of The Hurt Business.

On the January 9, 2023 episode of Raw, Alexander and Benjamin reunited to take part in a Tag Team Turmoil match. Earlier during the show, Lashley and MVP teased an alliance, with MVP crediting himself for reuniting Benjamin and Alexander, and getting Lashley reinstated on Raw after being suspended. On the February 6 edition of Raw, Alexander and Benjamin defeated Alpha Academy with MVP in their corner further hinting at a possible reunion.

Other media
Alexander made his video game debut in WWE 2K18 and subsequently appears in WWE 2K19 WWE 2K20 and WWE 2K22.

Personal life
In June 2018, Johnson married fellow professional wrestler Aerial Monroe, who previously competed in All Elite Wrestling under the nickname of "Big Swole." They have one daughter.

Championships and accomplishments

 America's Most Liked Wrestling
 AML Prestige Championship (1 time)
 AML Prestige Championship Tournament (2016)
 CWF Mid-Atlantic
 CWF Mid-Atlantic Television Championship (1 time)
 PWI Ultra J Championship (1 time)
 Exodus Wrestling Alliance
 EWA Junior Heavyweight Championship (1 time)
 Premiere Wrestling Federation	
 PWF WORLD-1 Heavyweight Championship (1 time)
 Match of the Year (2015) - with Colby Corino
 Premiere Wrestling Xperience
 PWX Heavyweight  Championship	(1 time)
 PWX Innovative Television Championship (1 time)
 Pro Wrestling EVO
 EVO Heavyweight Championship (1 time)
 Pro Wrestling Illustrated PWI ranked him No. 28 of the top 500 singles wrestlers in the PWI 500'' in 2018
 WrestleForce
 WrestleForce Championship (2 times)
 WWE
 WWE 24/7 Championship (3 times)
 WWE Cruiserweight Championship (1 time)
 WWE Raw Tag Team Championship (1 time) – with Shelton Benjamin
 WWE Cruiserweight Championship Tournament (2018)
 Slammy Award (1 time)
 Trash Talker of the Year (2020)

References

External links

 

1989 births
Living people
American male professional wrestlers
African-American male professional wrestlers
People from Charlotte, North Carolina
WWE 24/7 Champions
NXT/WWE Cruiserweight Champions
21st-century African-American sportspeople
20th-century African-American people
21st-century professional wrestlers